Wax is the seventh studio album by French new wave band Indochine. It was released on November 4, 1996.

Track listing
 Unisexe - 5:03
 Révolution - 4:50
 Drugstar - 3:30
 Je n'embrasse pas - 5:32
 Coma, coma, coma - 4:36
 Echo-Ruby - 5:10
 Les silences de Juliette - 3:57
 Satellite - 4:11
 Mire-Live - 3:34
 Ce soir, le ciel - 4:06
 Kissing My Song - 4:04
 L'amoureuse - 4:43
 Peter Pan - 4:58

References

External links
 Detailed album information at www.indo-chine.org

1996 albums
Indochine (band) albums